Koivunen is a Finnish surname. Notable people with the surname include:

Aimo Koivunen (1917-1989), Finnish soldier
Ari Koivunen (born 1984), Finnish heavy metal singer
Brita Koivunen (1931–2014), Finnish schlager singer
Ensio Kalevi Koivunen (1930–2003), Finnish serial killer
Hannes Koivunen (1911–1990), Finnish boxer
Tuulikki Koivunen Bylund (born 1947), Finnish-born Swedish theologian

Finnish-language surnames